The pygmy poacher (Odontopyxis trispinosa) is a species of poacher that is native to the eastern Pacific Ocean along the North American coast from southern Alaska to northern Mexico. This species grows to a length of  TL. This species is commonly displayed in public aquariums. This species is the only known member of its genus.

References
 

Bathyagoninae
Fish described in 1880
Taxa named by William Neale Lockington